Alexis Bittar is the designer and CEO of the eponymous jewelry and lifestyle brand. He was credited for reviving the art costume jewelry movement in the 1990s.

In 2004, Bittar was named "Rising Star of the Year" at the ACE Awards. In 2010, he won the CFDA Accessory Designer of the Year award. In November 2014, he received the Brand of the year from ACE.

Personal life 
Bittar was born in 1968 in Brooklyn, New York City to Bob and Helen Bittar, both university professors and antique collectors.

At age ten, Bittar began selling flowers from a hand-painted cart near his home in the Bay Ridge neighborhood of Brooklyn. As a teenager, he sold antique jewelry and vintage clothing on St. Mark's Street in New York City. Once, as a birthday present, Bittar's parents purchased him $300.00 worth of vintage jewelry that he then used as the seedlings of his nascent commercial operation. Bittar discovered the New York club scene while attending the Bronx High School of Science, which fueled his interest in fashion and design.

Bittar briefly attended State University of New York at Albany, but dropped out during his second semester. When he returned to New York, Bittar continued to party and supported himself selling antique jewelry and vintage clothing on the streets of lower Manhattan. Recognizing the destructive influence they had on his life, Bittar closed the door on drugs and alcohol and got sober by the time he was 22. He continued to pursue his interest in jewelry and design, focusing on his own line of costume jewelry influenced by the antique collectibles he grew up around.

In 2015, Bittar had two children.

Career 

In 1988, Bittar began to design his own line of jewelry. He bought his first block of Lucite in 1990 and holed up in his apartment figuring out how to hand carve it into the jewelry vision he had.

Using Lucite and semi-precious stones and metals, Bittar began selling handmade pieces on the streets of Soho. Dawn Mello, the fashion director of Bergdorf Goodman, discovered his work in 1992 and agreed to carry his designs, followed by Saks Fifth Avenue, the Museum of Modern Art, Harrods, and Isetan in Japan.

In 1996, he designed a limited edition set of home wares for Barneys New York and Takashimaya, and a collection of Lucite and steel furniture for The Cooper Hewitt Museum.

In 1998, Bittar launched the first of what would become many designer collaborations, working with Burberry, the British luxury fashion house. Bittar designed Burberry's first Ready-to-wear jewelry collection, interpreting their trademark plaid onto Lucite. Subsequent collaborations include legendary stylist and costume designer Patricia Field for Sex and the City, the Cooper-Hewitt Museum, Estee Lauder, Michael Kors, Jason Wu, Jeremy Scott, Michael Angel, and Phillip Lim.

In 1999, he designed the first Burberry´s first Ready-to-Wear jewelry collection.

Michelle Obama regularly chose to wear Alexis Bittar pieces. Other celebrities who have been seen wearing the brand are: Lady Gaga, Beyoncé, Solange Knowles, Nina Dobrev, Shailene Woodley, Debra Gold – Toronto Cameron Diaz, Alicia Keys, and Christina Aguilera.

In 2004, Bittar opened his first boutique on Broome St. and went on to open a total of 15 stores in the US.

In 2010, Bittar featured Joan Collins as the face of his Spring campaign. Bittar wanted to mimic 80's fashion and believed Joan was perfect for this role considering she was the 1980s soap opera Queen.

Fashion icon Lauren Hutton is the new face for the brand's 2011 ad campaign photographed by artist and photographer Jack Pierson.

Bittar continues his focus on iconic women by casing the comedy Duo Jennifer Saunders and Joanna Lumely in the fall campaign dressed as their infamous characters, Edina Monsoon and Patsy Stone from the hit British show 'Absolutely Fabulous'.

In spring 2015, Bittar cast two of the industry's most well known names in his ads, 93-year-old fashion eccentric Iris Apfel, and Tavi Gevinson, the teen blogger turned rookie editor turn Broadway star- 19. The ads were meant to highlight the essence of strong women.

In fall 2015, Zoe Kravitz fronts Bittar. The ad showcases Kravitz's style.

In 2010, Bittar entered into partnership with Private Equity company TSG Consumer Partners and in 2015, they sold to Carolee LLC, the jewelry arm of Brooks Brothers.

After a five-year absence, Bittar reacquired the brand from Brooks Brothers after they filed for bankruptcy in fall of 2020. Bittar is again full owner of his brand which relaunches in fall 2021with expanded product categories including accessories and home décor. 6 new brick and mortar boutiques will open in New York City and San Francisco in September and October 2021 designed by Tony award winning scenic designer, Scott Pask.

Awards and honors 
2010 Council of Fashion Designers of America Accessory Designer of the Year
2004 Rising Star of the Year by the Accessories Council of Excellence 
2014 Brand of the Year Accessories Council of Excellence

References

External links

1968 births
Living people
American jewelry designers
People from Bay Ridge, Brooklyn
Artists from New York City
The Bronx High School of Science alumni
University at Albany, SUNY alumni